Brissopsis is a genus of echinoderms belonging to the family Brissidae.

The genus has almost cosmopolitan distribution.

Species:

Brissopsis alta 
Brissopsis atlantica 
Brissopsis bengalensis 
Brissopsis caparti 
Brissopsis columbaris 
Brissopsis elongata 
Brissopsis evanescens 
Brissopsis jarlii 
Brissopsis luzonica 
Brissopsis lyrifera 
Brissopsis micropetala 
Brissopsis obliqua 
Brissopsis oldhami 
Brissopsis pacifica 
Brissopsis parallela 
Brissopsis similis 
Brissopsis zealandiae

References

 
Echinoidea genera